Gyorche Petrov Nikolov born Georgi Petrov Nikolov (April 2, 1865 – June 28, 1921), was a Bulgarian teacher and revolutionary, one of the leaders of the Bulgarian Macedonian-Adrianople Revolutionary Committees.  He was their representative in Sofia, the capital of Principality of Bulgaria. As such he was also elected a member of the Supreme Macedonian-Adrianople Committee (SMAC), participating in the work of its governing body. During the Balkan Wars, Petrov was a Bulgarian army volunteer, and during the First World War, he was involved in the activity of the Bulgarian occupation authorities in Serbia and Greece. Subsequently, he participated in Bulgarian politics, but was eventually killed by order of the rivaling IMARO right-wing faction. Despite his Bulgarian self-identification, according to the post-World War II Macedonian historiography, he was an ethnic Macedonian.

Biography 
Born in Varoš (Prilep), Ottoman Empire (today North Macedonia), he studied at the Bulgarian Exarchate's school in Prilep and the Bulgarian Men's High School of Thessaloniki. Later he attended the Gymnasium in Plovdiv, capital of the recently created Eastern Rumelia. Here he joined the Bulgarian Secret Central Revolutionary Committee founded in 1885. The original purpose of the committee was to gain autonomy for the region of Macedonia  (then called Western Rumelia), but it played an important role in the organization of the  Unification of Bulgaria and Eastern Rumelia. Afterwards, Petrov worked as a Bulgarian Exarchate's teacher in various towns of Macedonia. He took part in the revolutionary campaign in Macedonia as well as in the Thessaloniki Congress of the Bulgarian Macedonian-Adrianople Revolutionary Committees (BMARC) in 1896. He was among the authors of the organization's new charter and rules, which he co-wrote with Gotse Delchev.

Gyorche Petrov was the representative of the Foreign Committee of the BMARC/IMARO in Sofia in 1897–1901. He did not approve of the ultimately outbreak of the Uprising on Ilinden, 2 August 1903, but he participated leading a squad. After the unsuccessful uprising Petrov continued his participation in IMARO. The failure of the Uprising reignited the rivalries between the varying factions of the Macedonian revolutionary movement. The left-wing faction including Petrov, opposed Bulgarian nationalism but the Centralist's faction of the IMARO, drifted more and more towards it. Petrov was again included in the Emigrant representation in Sofia in 1905–1908. After the Young Turks Revolution of 1908, Petrov together with writer Anton Strashimirov edited the "Kulturno Edinstvo" magazine ("Cultural Unity"), published in Thessaloniki (Solun). In 1911 a new Central Committee of IMARO was formed and the Centralists faction gained full control over the Organization.

During the Balkan wars, Gyorche Petrov was a volunteer in the 5th company of Macedonian-Adrianopolitan Volunteer Corps. He was President of the Regular Regional Committee in Bitola for some time during the Bulgarian occupation of Southern Serbia, i.e. Vardar Macedonia, but after the Bulgarian occuparion of Northern Greece, became a mayor of Drama. At the end of the war he was one of the initiators of the formation of a new leftist organization called Provisional representation of the former United Internal Revolutionary Organization, and this government set a task of defending the positions of the Bulgarians in Macedonia at the Paris Peace Conference (1919–1920).

He kept close ties with the new government of Bulgarian Agrarian National Union (BANU), especially with war minister Aleksandar Dimitrov and some other prominent Agrarian leaders. BANU rejected territorial expansion and aimed at forming a Balkan federation of agrarian states, a policy which began with a détente with Yugoslavia. As a result, Petrov became a Chief of the Bulgarian Refugees Agency by the Ministry of Internal Affairs. Then Petrov had to deal with the problem of Bulgarian refugees who had to leave Yugoslavia and Greece, thus incurring IMRO (Internal Macedonian Revolutionary Organization) Centralist faction leaders' hatred upon himself. One of the reasons for this was the open struggle of the IMRO with the government of the BANU, and on the other hand, the interplay between the various refugees organizations and the attempt of IMRO to acquire them.

He was eventually killed by an IMRO assassin in June 1921 in Sofia. The assassination of Gyorche Petrov complicated relations between IMRO and the Bulgarian government and produced significant dissensions in the Macedonian movement.

To honor his name a suburb of Skopje was named Ǵorče Petrov, or usually shortly referred to only as Ǵorče. The suburb is one of the ten municipalities of Skopje, the capital of North Macedonia.

Gallery

References

External links 
 G. Petrov, Materials on the Study of Macedonia, Sofia, 1896, pp. 724-725, 731; the original is in Bulgarian - Information on the ethnic composition of the population in Macedonia, 1896

1864 births
1921 deaths
People from Prilep
Members of the Internal Macedonian Revolutionary Organization
Bulgarian revolutionaries
Bulgarian military personnel of the Balkan Wars
Bulgarian educators
Burials at Central Sofia Cemetery
Macedonian Bulgarians
Assassinated Bulgarian people
People murdered in Bulgaria
Deaths by firearm in Bulgaria